The Tacoma Tides was an American soccer club based in Tacoma, Washington that was a member of the American Soccer League. It began play in 1976, but the league folded the following year. It was owned by businessman and future governor Booth Gardner; among its players was backup goalkeeper Bruce Arena, who later coached several Major League Soccer champions and the United States men's national team.

Year-by-year
In their only year of existence, the Tides finished 2nd in the ASL Western Division. They defeated the Utah Golden Spikers in the playoff quarterfinals, 2–1, then lost in overtime to the eventual champion Los Angeles Skyhawks in the semifinals by a score of 2–1.

Management
 Booth Gardner – Owner
 Stan Naccarato – General Manager

Coach
 Dan Wood
 David Chadwick (assistant)

Roster

External links
 Article on Arena, mentions several players, Dan Wood and Stan Naccarato

References

Defunct soccer clubs in Washington (state)
Sports in Tacoma, Washington
American Soccer League (1933–1983) teams
1976 establishments in Washington (state)
1976 disestablishments in Washington (state)
Association football clubs established in 1976
Association football clubs disestablished in 1976